EliteXC: Uprising was a mixed martial arts event promoted by EliteXC and co-promoted by Icon Sport and Rumble World Entertainment. The event took place on Saturday, September 15, 2007 at the Neal S. Blaisdell Arena in Oahu, Hawaii.

Background
Following several co-promotions and the debut of ShoXC, EliteXC returned with their second official show 7 months after their debut with EliteXC: Destiny.

The main card aired on Showtime.  The main event featured a middleweight unification match between EliteXC Middleweight Champion, Murilo Rua, and ICON Sport Middlweight Champion, Robbie Lawler.

In a rare move for MMA, the untelevised matches occurred after the main card and streamed live on the Proelite.com website.

Results

See also
 Elite Xtreme Combat
 2007 in Elite Xtreme Combat

References

External links
Official EliteXC Site
Official Showtime Networks, Inc. Site

Uprising
2007 in mixed martial arts
Mixed martial arts in Hawaii
Sports in Honolulu
2007 in sports in Hawaii